Jones Lake may refer to:

 Wahleach Lake, also known as Jones Lake, in British Columbia, Canada
 Jones Lake State Park, North Carolina, United States
 Billy Jones Lake, Northeastern Oregon, United States
 Jones Lake, an artificial lake in Centennial Park, Moncton, New Brunswick, Canada

See also
 Carlton Jones Lake (died 1998), American choral conductor
 Lake Jones (1867–1930), United States federal judge